Eyal B (born 12 September 1974), is an Israeli animator, director, screenwriter, comic book artist and designer.

Early life
Since his teenage years, Eyal has been conceptualizing and creating comics and animation. In 1991, when he was only 16, Eyal (Along with Yaron niski and Amitai Sandy) published an Avant-Garde Israeli comic's magazine named "Penguin's perversion". A seemingly wild, dark humor magazine with an underline of satire and social criticism. A continues story from the magazine, called "The passive vampire" also created by Eyal, was later published as its own title, dedicated to all the chapters of the story published in the magazine.

Career
Eyal received recognition after creating the TV animation series Munch, a show that was broadcast as part as the popular late night show Night butterfly on Channel 2, some of the most famous bits in the show were nostalgic animated pieces, dedicated to old TV shows that were popular in the 1980s. Under Eyal's point of view, they received new identities, The Smurfs became "Dardasatla" (a play on the word Smurfs and "getting high" in Hebrew) and The Heart ("Narco", a play on the main character's name, Marco)

In 2000, Eyal was the co-creator, along with Tedy Production Company, of Studio Eyal B. The studio produced an extensive list of shows such as "The show with the dolls" (Ha'tochnit Eem Ha-Boobot), "Mister Motek", the parody "Avishai Ha-Hores", a sub-segment of the show "Y in 10" for YES Broadcasting company, "The goozniks" (Hagoozinikim) for Channel 24, The Israeli Music Channel, and an animated episode for "The pajamas" a popular TV show on Channel 6 – The Israeli Children's channel. Also, A music video for the song "King's path" by the group "Kele 6" and a music video for the song "Bombei" by Dana Berger. 
In 2008, Eyal designed the characters and produced the animation video for "Bago Dago", the first-ever animated virtual band in Israel, covering famous rhythm & Blues and Hip hop tunes with Hebrew lyrics. He produced three animated music videos for the band: "Ten la" (A cover for the song "Smack that" by Eminem and Akon), "Arab Boyfriend (In Hebrew: Chaver Aravi)" (A cover for the song "American boy" By Kanye West and Estelle) and "Hello, Hello", an original song.
 
In 2010, Eyal cooperated with Gaga Production Company to create TV and web commercials as well as original animated shows.
Between the years 2011–2012, Eyal created and directed two seasons of the sketch comedy "The Green Project", produced by the Israeli Comedy central Channel, for "Hot" Cable and broadcast company. The uniqueness of the series comes from the method which it was filmed, first on a green screen and only than mashed with whimsical and fantasy-like cartoons, backgrounds and animation mixed with live shots. The show was sold to a variety of Channels in countries outside of Israel such as Norway and Argentina. One of the major channels it was sold to is the Chinese Hunan TV channel, a top channel with over 60 million viewers.

Since 2013 and still ongoing, Eyal works for the most popular comedy show in Israel, "Eretz Nehederet" on Channel 2 flagship show, creating original green screen sketches, such as Star Wars Parody and Game of Thrones parody
Nowadays and since 2014, Eyal is working on an independent project of an animated science fiction comedy. 
He directed, co-wrote, and designed the characters for the WantaFanta animated TV campaign, for Fanta, the Coca-Cola brand. On 2014, Eyal was also part of Simcha Jacobvici TV production "Biblical conspiracies", aired on the American Discovery Channel, Science channel and more.
Recently, one of Eyals videos went viral, a green screen wedding proposal he created, an epic production that earned tens of thousands and likes and shares on line and got TV exposure

Nominations
 In 2012, the Green Project show was nominated for the Israeli Emmy award on the "Best entertainment show" category
 In 2014, Eyal B was nominated for the Video Art and special effects category for his role in the satire ketch show "Erez Nehederet"

See also
איל B
The Green Project

External links
 Eyal B Website, Eyal B Studio
 אייל B, ishim
 Eyal B YouTube channel, YouTube
 Miri Ben-Ari Dim The Lights!, YouTube
 Eyal B on Behabce, Behance
 I Made My Lovely Teenage Daughter The Star Of My Film, boredpanda
 I Created These Sci-fi Special Effects Using My Laptop At Home, boredpanda
 To the Moon & Back: The Hard Working Path of Filmmaker Eyal B, spacetrippingblog

References

Israeli animators
Israeli animated film directors
Israeli comics artists
1974 births
Living people